Panduranga primarily refers to the deity Vithoba. It may also refer to:

 Panduranga (Champa), an ancient Cham kingdom in Vietnam
 Another name of Phan Rang, a region in Vietnam 
 Panduranga (film), a Telugu film about the deity
 Panduranga Mahatyam, a work in praise of the deity by Tenali Ramakrishna
 Panduranga Mahatyam (film)